Cram-Chaban (known as Cramchaban until 31 December 2022) is a commune in the Charente-Maritime department in the Nouvelle-Aquitaine region in southwestern France.

Population

Its inhabitants are known as Cramois or Cramchabanais.

See also
 Communes of the Charente-Maritime department

References

External links
 

Communes of Charente-Maritime
Arrondissement of La Rochelle
Charente-Maritime communes articles needing translation from French Wikipedia